Hnivan urban hromada is a territorial hromada (municipality) in the Vinnytsia region of Ukraine. The administration of the hromada is located in the city of Hnivan. It was created on 22 November 2016 through the merger of Hnivan city council with the Demydivka village council. On 25 October 2020 the municipality incorporated the villages of Hryzhyntsi, Mohylivka, Demydivka, Selyshche, Urozhaine, Voroshylivka, Mayaniv, Borskiv, Potoky and Ryzhavka. The hromada is divided into 4 starosta districts. Population:

References

Hromadas of Vinnytsia Oblast
2016 establishments in Ukraine